The 1995 World Judo Championships were the 19th edition of the World Judo Championships, and were held in Chiba, Japan in 1995.

Medal overview

Men

Women

Medal table

Results overview

Men

60 kg

65 kg

71 kg

78 kg

86 kg

95 kg

+95 kg

Open class

Women

48 kg

52 kg

56 kg

61 kg

66 kg

72 kg

+72 kg

Open class

External links
 

World Championships
World Championships 1995
World Judo Championships
World Judo Championships
World Judo Championships
World Judo Championships
J